This article shows various records for the venues that the Brisbane Broncos have played at.
 P= Played, W=Win, D=Draw, L=Loss, F=Points For, A=Points Against, %=Win Percentage

Home Games

Average Home Crowds

* Season in progress (2015).

Suncorp Stadium (Lang Park)

ANZ Stadium

Away Games

Stadiums